This is a list of football clubs in Fiji.

Teams are listed according to the league in which they currently play.

Premier League (First Tier) 
Ba F.C.
Labasa F.C.
Lautoka F.C.
Nadi F.C.
Nadroga F.C.
Nasinu F.C.
Navua F.C.
Rewa F.C.
Suva F.C.
Tailevu Naitasiri F.C.

Senior League (Second Tier) 
Bua F.C.
Dreketi F.C.
Lami F.C.
Nadogo F.C.
Rakiraki F.C.
Savusavu F.C.
Seaqaqa F.C.
Tailevu North F.C.
Taveuni F.C.
Tavua F.C.

De-registered
Addisbrough F.C.
Levuka F.C.
Nalawa F.C.
Nokia Eagles
Vatukoula F.C.

Fiji
 
Football clubs
football clubs